is a Japanese manga written and illustrated by Takehito Mizuki. The manga was serialised in MediaWorks's monthly Dengeki Daioh before MediaWorks moved the title to the quarterly Dengeki Moeoh. The manga was formerly licensed in English by ComicsOne and DrMaster.

Characters
 is the female protagonist and Takaya's robot maid. 
 is the male protagonist and Yui's owner. He has a maid fetish and is good at cooking and sewing. 
 likes Takaya and works as a maid in her dad's cafe, Cafe Cowbeya. 
 is Minori's father and Cafe Cowbeya's owner. 
 is the shop manager. 
 
 is Ayumi's mother. 
 is the younger sister of Sumire. 
 is the older sister of Ran. 
 is Takaya's ultimate customized figurine.

Media

Manga
Koharu Biyori is written and illustrated by Takehito Mizuki. The manga was serialised in MediaWorks's monthly Dengeki Daioh before MediaWorks moved the title to the quarterly Dengeki Moeoh. The manga is licensed in North America by ComicsOne. The English license was transferred to DrMaster after ComicsOne's collapse. As of February, 2009, MediaWorks has published four tankōbon of the manga. ComicsOne released the first volume of the manga on February 16, 2005. The manga is licensed in Taiwan by Ever Glory Publishing.

Volume listing

Anime
The manga was adapted into a three-episode original video animation by Doumu. The anime is licensed in the United States by Sentai Filmworks and distributed by ADV Films. However, with ADV being shut down, distribution was now handled by Section23 Films. It was also distributed in Russia by MC Entertainment. The episodes were released in Japan between October 14, 2007 and April 2, 2008.

Geneon released 3 DVDs in Japan. The first DVD was released on November 21, 2007. The second DVD was released on February 8, 2008. The final DVD was released on April 2, 2008. The subtitled series was released on March 10, 2009 in the US, there is no English-dubbed version available.

The original video animations use three pieces of theme music.  by Eri Kitamura is the series' opening theme, while   by Eri Kitamura and Satomi Akesaka is the ending theme for the first two episodes.  by Eri Kitamura is the ending theme for the third episode.

Episode list

Soundtrack CDs
On November 21, 2007, Geneon released an animation soundtrack CD for Koharu Biyori.

Geneon released two Maniac CDs for Koharu Biyori. The first CD, Koharu Biyori Maniacs CD 1 was released on December 21, 2007. The second CD, Koharu Biyori Maniacs CD 2 was released on February 22, 2008. The songs are sung by the voice actors/actresses of the characters.

Reception
Mania.com's Eduardo M. Chavez criticised the manga for having "no plot" and a cast that "lacks personality". He also criticized the manga for the overuse of the moe anthropomorphism. Liann Cooper from Anime News Network criticises the manga for having "no plot" and that the manga's "illustrations look like sloppy sketches". Anime Fringe's Janet Crooker classifies the manga as a Chobits parody.

Mania.com's Chris Beveridge commends the OVAs for its "character designs are good, the fanservice just right and it plays things at a slightly different angle because of the androids and the lack of a real crush/interest in the main characters". THEM Anime's Carlos Ross criticises the OVA for "very juvenile" writing and further comments that the OVA "is not a cleanly or adroitly written work in regards to pacing". He also criticises the "very abrupt, kludgy transitions (particularly between episodes two and three) that seem to come clean out of left field".

References

External links
 Official website 
 
 

2004 manga
2007 anime OVAs
ASCII Media Works manga
Kadokawa Dwango franchises
Comedy anime and manga
Science fiction anime and manga
Seinen manga
Sentai Filmworks